The 2011 WNBA season is the 13th season for the Connecticut Sun franchise of the Women's National Basketball Association. It is their ninth in Connecticut.

Transactions

WNBA Draft
The following are the Sun's selections in the 2011 WNBA Draft.

Transaction log
February 3: The Sun re-signed Tan White and Kerri Gardin.
February 14: The Sun signed draft pick Danielle McCray.
April 8: The Sun signed Rachele Fitz to a training camp contract.
April 10: The Sun signed Stefanie Murphy to a training camp contract.
April 11: The Sun traded a third-round pick in the 2012 Draft to the Phoenix Mercury in exchange for draft rights to Tahnee Robinson.
April 11: The Sun traded draft rights to Sydney Colson to the New York Liberty in exchange for Kalana Greene.
May 25: The Sun waived Adrienne Johnson, Tahnee Robinson, and Rachele Fitz.
June 1: The Sun waived Stefanie Murphy.
June 3: The Sun signed Jessica Moore and waived Kerri Gardin.
July 22: The Sun waived DeMya Walker.
July 24: The Sun signed Jessica Breland to a seven-day contract.

Trades

Personnel changes

Additions

Subtractions

Roster

Depth

Season standings

Schedule

Preseason

|- align="center" bgcolor="bbffbb"
| 1 || May 19 || 7:00pm || China || 101–63 || Greene, Griffin (13) || Charles (10) || Montgomery (6) || Mohegan Sun Arena  4,666 || 1–0
|- align="center" bgcolor="ffbbbb"
| 2 || May 25 || 7:00pm || San Antonio || 56–80 || White (15) || Charles (17) || Lawson (5) || Mohegan Sun Arena  4,801 || 1–1
|- align="center" bgcolor="bbffbb"
| 3 || May 27 || 7:00pm || San Antonio || 75–73 || Charles (17) || Charles (11) || Jones (4) || Mohegan Sun Arena at Casey Plaza  2,139 || 2–1
|-

Regular season

|- align="center" bgcolor="bbffbb"
| 1 || June 4 || 7:00pm || Washington ||  || 89–73 || Charles (18) || Jones (7) || Lawson (4) || Mohegan Sun Arena  6,666 || 1–0
|- align="center" bgcolor="ffbbbb"
| 2 || June 10 || 8:30pm || @ Chicago ||  || 75–78 || Montgomery (22) || Greene (6) || LawsonMontgomeryWhite (4) || Allstate Arena  6,609 || 1–1
|- align="center" bgcolor="bbffbb"
| 3 || June 12 || 3:00pm || Tulsa ||  || 90–79 || Charles (19) || Charles (8) || Montgomery (7) || Mohegan Sun Arena  6,520 || 2–1
|- align="center" bgcolor="bbffbb"
| 4 || June 16 || 7:00pm || @ Washington || CSN-MA || 79–71 || Charles (26) || Charles (10) || Montgomery (5) || Verizon Center  7,028 || 3–1
|- align="center" bgcolor="bbffbb"
| 5 || June 19 || 1:00pm || Chicago ||  || 83–68 || Charles (31) || Charles (12) || Jones (4) || Mohegan Sun Arena  6,875 || 4–1
|- align="center" bgcolor="ffbbbb"
| 6 || June 23 || 8:00pm || @ Chicago || CN100 || 101–107 (2OT) || Montgomery (33) || Charles (13) || Montgomery (6) || Allstate Arena  3,319 || 4–2 
|- align="center" bgcolor="ffbbbb"
| 7 || June 25 || 7:00pm || @ Indiana || NBATVCSN-NE || 70–75 || Montgomery (19) || Charles (11) || Montgomery (6) || Conseco Fieldhouse  7,100 || 4–3 
|- align="center" bgcolor="bbffbb"
| 8 || June 28 || 8:00pm || Los Angeles || ESPN2 || 79–76 || Charles (22) || Charles (23) || Montgomery (5) || Mohegan Sun Arena  6,515 || 5–3 
|-

|- align="center" bgcolor="bbffbb"
| 9 || July 1 || 7:30pm || Seattle || CSN-NE || 75–70 || Charles (20) || Charles (10) || Montgomery (8) || Mohegan Sun Arena  7,748 || 6–3 
|- align="center" bgcolor="ffbbbb"
| 10 || July 9 || 8:00pm || @ Minnesota || NBATVFS-N || 67–90 || Montgomery (14) || Charles (8) || JonesLawson (3) || Target Center  8,205 || 6–4 
|- align="center" bgcolor="ffbbbb"
| 11 || July 13 || 1:00pm || @ Indiana ||  || 78–90 || White (17) || Charles (11) || Montgomery (4) || Conseco Fieldhouse  9,045 || 6–5 
|- align="center" bgcolor="bbffbb"
| 12 || July 15 || 7:00pm || @ New York || NBATVCSN-NE || 68–59 || Charles (15) || Jones (7) || Montgomery (4) || Prudential Center  7,722 || 7–5 
|- align="center" bgcolor="bbffbb"
| 13 || July 17 || 5:00pm || Indiana ||  || 76–71 || McCray (22) || Charles (14) || Montgomery (7) || Mohegan Sun Arena  7,075 || 8–5 
|- align="center" bgcolor="bbffbb"
| 14 || July 19 || 7:30pm || New York ||  || 85–79 || Charles (24) || Charles (7) || Montgomery (10) || Mohegan Sun Arena  6,096 || 9–5 
|-
| colspan="11" align="center" valign="middle" | All-Star break
|- align="center" bgcolor="bbffbb"
| 15 || July 26 || 8:00pm || @ Chicago || CSN-NECN100 || 77–66 || Jones (22) || Charles (15) || Montgomery (6) || Allstate Arena  3,091 || 10–5
|- align="center" bgcolor="ffbbbb"
| 16 || July 28 || 7:30pm || Indiana ||  || 58–69 || Charles (13) || Charles (10) || Montgomery (3) || Mohegan Sun Arena  6,329 || 10–6 
|- align="center" bgcolor="bbffbb"
| 17 || July 31 || 5:00pm || Atlanta ||  || 99–92 || Montgomery (19) || Charles (11) || Lawson (9) || Mohegan Sun Arena  6,955 || 11–6 
|-

|- align="center" bgcolor="bbffbb"
| 18 || August 3 || 3:00pm || @ Los Angeles || NBATV || 79–70 || Charles (20) || Charles (13) || Montgomery (6) || STAPLES Center  14,266 || 12–6 
|- align="center" bgcolor="ffbbbb"
| 19 || August 5 || 10:00pm || @ Seattle || NBATV || 79–81 || Montgomery (19) || Charles (10) || White (4) || KeyArena  7,289 || 12–7 
|- align="center" bgcolor="bbffbb"
| 20 || August 7 || 6:00pm || @ Phoenix || NBATVFS-A || 96–95 (OT) || Montgomery (28) || Charles (17) || Greene (6) || US Airways Center  8,514 || 13–7 
|- align="center" bgcolor="bbffbb"
| 21 || August 9 || 7:30pm || Chicago ||  || 69–58 || Charles (16) || Charles (11) || LawsonWhite (4) || Mohegan Sun Arena  6,049 || 14–7
|- align="center" bgcolor="ffbbbb"
| 22 || August 11 || 7:30pm || San Antonio || FS-SW || 59–72 || Jones (16) || Jones (10) || McCray (2) || Mohegan Sun Arena  5,334 || 14–8 
|- align="center" bgcolor="bbffbb"
| 23 || August 13 || 7:00pm || Washington ||  || 82–75 || CharlesMontgomery (16) || White (10) || JonesLawson (5) || Mohegan Sun Arena  6,717 || 15–8 
|- align="center" bgcolor="bbffbb"
| 24 || August 16 || 7:30pm || Minnesota || CSN-NE || 108–79 || Montgomery (17) || Charles (18) || Montgomery (7) || Mohegan Sun Arena  9,323 || 16–8 
|- align="center" bgcolor="ffbbbb"
| 25 || August 18 || 7:00pm || @ New York || NBATVMSG || 81–84 (OT) || Charles (29) || Charles (14) || Montgomery (5) || Prudential Center  7,245 || 16–9 
|- align="center" bgcolor="ffbbbb"
| 26 || August 19 || 7:30pm || @ Atlanta || NBATVSSO || 88–94 (OT) || Jones (21) || CharlesGriffin (11) || Montgomery (7) || Philips Arena  7,225 || 16–10 
|- align="center" bgcolor="bbffbb"
| 27 || August 21 || 5:00pm || Atlanta ||  || 96–87 || Montgomery (21) || Jones (10) || Montgomery (8) || Mohegan Sun Arena  6,636 || 17–10 
|- align="center" bgcolor="bbffbb"
| 28 || August 26 || 7:30pm || Phoenix || CSN-NE || 95–92 || Charles (17) || Jones (11) || Montgomery (6) || Mohegan Sun Arena  9,007 || 18–10 
|- align="center" bgcolor="ffbbbb"
| 29 || August 28 || 4:00pm || @ Tulsa ||  || 72–83 || Charles (21) || Charles (10) || CharlesJonesMontgomery (3) || BOK Center  4,813 || 18–11 
|- align="center" bgcolor="ffbbbb"
| 30 || August 30 || 8:00pm || @ San Antonio ||  || 66–78 || Charles (16) || Jones (10) || CharlesMontgomery (4) || AT&T Center  6,934 || 18–12 
|-

|- align="center" bgcolor="bbffbb"
| 31 || September 2 || 7:30pm || Indiana ||  || 83–55 || McCray (14) || Charles (16) || Charles (7) || Mohegan Sun Arena  6,991 || 19–12 
|- align="center" bgcolor="bbffbb"
| 32 || September 4 || 4:00pm || @ Washington || NBATVCSN-MA || 79–48 || Charles (24) || Charles (15) || Montgomery (7) || Verizon Center  13,403 || 20–12 
|- align="center" bgcolor="ffbbbb"
| 33 || September 6 || 7:30pm || @ Atlanta || SSO || 74–85 || Charles (17) || Charles (12) || Montgomery (7) || Philips Arena  6,558 || 20–13
|- align="center" bgcolor="bbffbb"
| 34 || September 11 || 1:00pm || New York || NBATV || 69–63 || Charles (18) || CharlesJones (11) || Montgomery (4) || Mohegan Sun Arena  9,115 || 21–13 
|-

| All games are viewable on WNBA LiveAccess or ESPN3.com

Postseason

|- align="center" bgcolor="ffbbbb"
| 1 || September 16 || 7:00pm || Atlanta || NBATV || 84–89 || JonesMontgomery (16) || McCray (8) || Lawson (4) || Mohegan Sun Arena  7,373 || 0–1
|- align="center" bgcolor="ffbbbb"
| 2 || September 18 || 3:00pm || @ Atlanta || ESPN2 || 64-69 || Jones (15) || Charles (17) || Montgomery (6) || Philips Arena  6,887 || 0–2
|-

Statistics

Regular season

Postseason

Awards and honors
Tina Charles was named WNBA Eastern Conference Player of the Week for the week of June 13, 2011.
Tina Charles was named WNBA Eastern Conference Player of the Week for the week of June 27, 2011.
Tina Charles was named WNBA Eastern Conference Player of the Week for the week of July 18, 2011.
Tina Charles was named WNBA Eastern Conference Player of the Week for the week of August 29, 2011.
Tina Charles was named WNBA Eastern Conference Player of the Month for the month of June.
Tina Charles was named to the 2011 WNBA All-Star Team as a starter.
Renee Montgomery was named to the 2011 WNBA All-Star Team as a reserve.
Tina Charles finished as a Peak Performer, averaging 11.0 rebounds per game.
Tina Charles was named to the All-Defensive Second Team.
Tina Charles was named to the All-WNBA First Team.

References

External links

Connecticut Sun seasons
Connecticut
Connecticut Sun
Events in Uncasville, Connecticut